Blind pass may refer to:
 Blind Pass, the strait that separates Captiva Island from Sanibel Island in Lee County, Florida
 Blind pass (basketball)